The Second Beel cabinet was the executive branch of the Dutch Government from 22 December 1958 until 19 May 1959. The cabinet was formed by the Christian-democratic Catholic People's Party (KVP), Anti-Revolutionary Party (ARP), and the Christian Historical Union (CHU) after the fall of the previous Third Drees cabinet. The caretaker cabinet was a centre-right coalition and had a slim majority in the House of Representatives with former Catholic Prime Minister Louis Beel returning as Prime Minister and dual served as Minister of Social Affairs and Health. Prominent Catholic politician Teun Struycken continued as Deputy Prime Minister and Minister of the Interior, Property and Public Organisations from previous cabinet and dual served as Minister of Justice.

The cabinet served during final years of the turbulent 1950s. Domestically its primary objective was to make preparations for a snap election in 1959. Following the election the cabinet continued in a demissionary capacity until it was replaced by the De Quay cabinet.

Formation
On 11 December 1958 the Third Drees cabinet fell after a crises between the Labour Party and the Catholic People's Party over the prolonging for a proposed tax increase from the initial two years to only one fiscal year. Following the fall of the cabinet the Labour Party left the coalition and the Catholic People's Party, Anti-Revolutionary Party and Christian Historical Union formed a rump cabinet. Former Prime Minister Louis Beel was appointed as Prime Minister on 22 December 1958.

Cabinet Members

References
 Four cabinet members would later be granted the honorary title of Minister of State: Louis Beel (1956), Jelle Zijlstra (1983), Jo Cals (1966) and Marga Klompé (1971).

References

External links
Official

  Kabinet-Beel II Parlement & Politiek
  Kabinet-Beel II Rijksoverheid

Cabinets of the Netherlands
1958 establishments in the Netherlands
1959 disestablishments in the Netherlands
Cabinets established in 1958
Cabinets disestablished in 1959
Caretaker governments